Perdue is a surname of English & Irish origin. It comes from Old French's par Dieu or 'by God', which was adopted into Middle English as an altered form. Notable people with the surname include:

Arthur Perdue, founder of Perdue Farms
Bev Perdue (born 1948), Governor of the U.S. state of North Carolina, 2009–2013
Bolo Perdue (1916–1988), American football end
David Perdue (born 1949), U.S. Senator from Georgia
Derelys Perdue (1902–1989), American silent-film actress and popular dancer
Frank Perdue (1920–2005), president of Perdue Farms for many years
Hub Perdue (1882–1968), professional baseball player
Jim Perdue, chairman and advertising spokesman of Perdue Farms
John Perdue, 24th State Treasurer of West Virginia
Lauren Perdue (born 1991), American swimmer
Lewis Perdue, American novelist
Peter C. Perdue (born 1949), American author, professor, and historian
Richard Perdue (1910–1998), Anglican bishop
Sally Perdue, former 1958 Miss Arkansas and Little Rock radio talk show host
Scott Perdue, aviation writer, author of novel Pale Moon Rising
Sonny Perdue (born 1946), 81st governor of the U.S. state of Georgia
Tito Perdue (born 1938), American writer
Will Perdue (born 1965), American former NBA professional basketball player

See also
, includes people with the surname Purdue

References